Andrea Sánchez Falcón (born 28 February 1997) is a Spanish professional footballer who plays as an attacking midfielder for Liga MX Femenil side Club América and the Spain women's national team. She previously played for Barcelona in Spain's Primera División.

International career

International goals

Honours

Club
FC Barcelona
Primera División: 2013–14, 2014–15, 2019–20, 2020–21, 2021–22
UEFA Women's Champions League: 2020–21
Copa de la Reina de Fútbol: 2014, 2019–20, 2020–21
Supercopa de España Femenina: 2019–20, 2021–22
Copa Catalunya: 2014, 2015

Atlético Madrid
 Primera División: Winner 2016–17, 2017–18

International
Spain
 Algarve Cup: Winner 2017

References

External links
 
 
 
 
 
 

1997 births
Living people
Footballers from the Canary Islands
Spanish women's footballers
Primera División (women) players
Atlético Madrid Femenino players
Women's association football midfielders
2019 FIFA Women's World Cup players
Spain women's international footballers
People from Arucas, Las Palmas
Sportspeople from the Province of Las Palmas
FC Barcelona Femení players
FC Barcelona Femení B players
Spain women's youth international footballers